Frea unifasciata is a species of beetle in the family Cerambycidae. It was described by Thomson in 1858. It is known from Cameroon, Gabon, the Democratic Republic of the Congo, the Central African Republic, the Ivory Coast, the Republic of the Congo, and Kenya. It feeds on Albizia adianthifolia, Celtis zenkeri, Petersianthus macrocarpus, and Antiaris africana.

Varietas
 Frea unifasciata var. bifuscovittata Breuning, 1954
 Frea unifasciata var. subannulicornis Breuning, 1968

References

unifasciata
Beetles described in 1858